2-Phosphoglyceric acid (2PG), or 2-phosphoglycerate, is a glyceric acid which serves as the substrate in the ninth step of glycolysis. It is catalyzed by enolase into phosphoenolpyruvate (PEP), the penultimate step in the conversion of glucose to pyruvate.

In glycolysis

See also
 3-Phosphoglyceric acid

References

Organophosphates
Glycolysis